Ridge Soaring Gliderport  was a public-use glider airport located two nautical miles (4 km) southwest of the central business district of Unionville, in Centre County, Pennsylvania, United States. It was privately owned by Knauff & Grove, Inc.

This FBO airport was world-famous for ridge, thermal and wave soaring. It was located on U.S. Route 220 (alternate) 8 miles south of Interstate 80, between Unionville and Julian, at the base of the Bald Eagle Mountain ridge. It was approximately 10 miles from State College and approximately midway between Altoona and Lock Haven in the Bald Eagle Valley. Visitors could look at an entire wall of U.S. National and World records that have been set from this airfield.

Facilities and aircraft 
It had one runway designated 7/25 with a 3,322 x 150 ft (1,013 x 46 m) asphalt and turf surface.

For the 12-month period ending June 30, 2006, the airport had 18,000 general aviation aircraft operations, an average of 49 per day. At that time there were 34 aircraft based at this airport: 88% glider and 12% single-engine.

At the airport there was a bunkhouse with showers, small kitchen, pilots lounge, motorhome facilities, aircraft hangars and protected storage for glider trailers.

A repair shop with an A&P mechanic and inspector was also on the field.

Airport facts 
 Portions of the 1999 movie The Thomas Crown Affair were filmed here.
 Co-owner Thomas L. Knauff set five FAI world records, and over 50 NAA national records flying from this airport.
 Co-owner Doris Grove set three FAI feminine world records flying from this airport, and was the first woman to fly a glider more than 1000 km.
 The Glider Port closed in  2022

References

External links 

 Official web site
 Centre Daily Times, Jun. 28, 2006, A different kind of bird, feature article
 A New Pilot’s Primer To Flying At ‘‘The Ridge'’

Airports in Pennsylvania
Gliderports in the United States
Bald Eagle Valley
Transportation buildings and structures in Centre County, Pennsylvania